TSS South Stack was a twin screw steamer passenger and cargo vessel operated by the London and North Western Railway from 1900 to 1923, and the London, Midland and Scottish Railway from 1923 to 1931.

History

She was built by Cammell Laird for the London and North Western Railway in 1900. She was named after the island South Stack, just off Holyhead.

She was decommissioned in 1931.

References

1900 ships
Passenger ships of the United Kingdom
Steamships
Ships built on the River Mersey
Ships of the London and North Western Railway